McBurney's point is the name given to the point over the right side of the abdomen that is one-third of the distance from the anterior superior iliac spine to the umbilicus (navel). This is near the most common location of the appendix.

Location 
McBurney's point is located one third of the distance from the right anterior superior iliac spine to the umbilicus (navel). This point roughly corresponds to the most common location of the base of the appendix, where it is attached to the cecum.

Clinical significance

Appendicitis 
Deep tenderness at McBurney's point, known as McBurney's sign, is a sign of acute appendicitis. The clinical sign of referred pain in the epigastrium when pressure is applied is also known as Aaron's sign. Specific localization of tenderness to McBurney's point indicates that inflammation is no longer limited to the lumen of the bowel (which localizes pain poorly), and is irritating the lining of the peritoneum at the place where the peritoneum comes into contact with the appendix. Tenderness at McBurney's point suggests the evolution of acute appendicitis to a later stage, and thus, the increased likelihood of rupture. Other abdominal processes can also sometimes cause tenderness at McBurney's point. Thus, this sign is highly useful but neither necessary nor sufficient to make a diagnosis of acute appendicitis. The anatomical position of the appendix is highly variable (for example in retrocaecal appendix, an appendix behind the caecum), which also limits the use of this sign, as many cases of appendicitis do not cause point tenderness at McBurney's point. For most open appendectomies (as opposed to laparoscopic appendectomies), the incision is made at McBurney's point.

Pseudoaneurysm 
A pseudoaneurysm in the aorta may be treated surgically, with an incision made between McBurney's point and the lower intercostal spaces.

Peritoneal dialysis 
McBurney's point may be a useful site for insertion of a peritoneal dialysis catheter.

History
McBurney's point is named after American surgeon Charles McBurney (1845–1913). McBurney himself did not locate his point in a precise way in his original article.

References

Bibliography

External links

Medical signs